Josef Suk Memorial is a museum in Křečovice, a village in the Central Bohemian Region of the Czech Republic. It was the home of the composer and violinist Josef Suk (1874–1935), and is now a museum dedicated to him.

Description
The house was built for the composer in 1895 by his father Josef Suk senior, a head teacher and director of the church choir in the village. The Bohemian Quartet, of which Suk was a founding member, rehearsed here, and he composed most of his works here.

After his death, his son Josef Suk (father of the violinist Josef Suk) made the house into a museum dedicated to the composer, and in 1951 he donated the house to the state. It became in 1956 a branch of the Antonín Dvořák Museum in Prague.

The museum has some original furnishings. It displays items relating to the life and work of the composer, and about the Bohemian Quartet. There is also some of his collection of decorative glassware and ceramics.

References

See also
List of music museums

Museums in the Central Bohemian Region
Music museums in the Czech Republic
Biographical museums in the Czech Republic